Lažánky is a municipality and village in Brno-Country District in the South Moravian Region of the Czech Republic. It has about 700 inhabitants.

Administrative parts
The village of Holasice is an administrative part of Lažánky.

History
The first written mention of Lažánky is from 1236.

References

Villages in Brno-Country District